Dhafer Youssef (born 19 November 1967) is a Tunisian composer, singer and oud player.

Biography 
Dhafer Youssef was born in Téboulba (a small village of coastal Tunisia); his grandfather was a muezzin. He calls the radio "the most important school" for him. He developed an interest in jazz at an early age and clandestinely listened to it during his education at a Qur'anic school. He later left Tunisia to start a jazz career and has lived in Europe since 1990, usually in Paris or Vienna. He also works in avant-garde and world music where he has been nominated for awards. He has released six albums of his own and created notable work with Sardinian trumpeter Paolo Fresu and the Norwegian guitarist Eivind Aarset. He has an affinity for the music of India and Nordic music. He was a guest artist on the Norwegian jazz artist Bugge Wesseltoft's album FiLM iNG. 
Youssef has performed with Ustad Zakir Hussain, Jon Hassell, Uri Caine, Tigran Hamasyan, Markus Stockhausen, Nguyên Lê, Omar Sosa and Hüsnü Şenlendirici.
Youssef is one of the ambassadors to Music Traveler, together with Billy Joel, Hans Zimmer, John Malkovich, Sean Lennon, Adrien Brody and more.
In 2001, he recorded Electric Sufi with the ex-Sugar Hill Gang and Tackhead rhythm section of Will Calhoun and Doug Wimbish.

In 2015, Youssef opened the Sligo Jazz project with a quartet act at the Hawk's Well Theatre at Connacht, Ireland.

Youssef released Diwan of Beauty and Odd in 2016 which won quite a bit of praise from critics.

Discography

Solo albums 
 1999: Malak (Enja)
 2001: Electric Sufi (Enja)
 2003: Digital Prophecy (Justin Time)
 2006: Divine Shadows (Jazzland)
 2007: Glow (Material), with Wolfgang Muthspiel
 2010: Abu Nawas Rhapsody (EmArcy)
 2013: Birds Requiem (Okeh) (FR: #191)
 2016: Diwan of Beauty and Odd (Okeh) (FR: #105)
 2018: Sounds of Mirrors
 2023: Street of Minarets

Collaborations 
 1997: Blue Planet – Peace for Kabul (Blue Flame World Music), with Lenny MacDowell and Hakim Ludin
 1998: hot ROOM (Extraplatte), also featuring Otto Lechner, Wolfgang Puschnig, Achim Tang
 2003: Exile (Enja), with Gilad Atzmon & The Orient House Ensemble feat. Reem Kelani & Dhafer Youssef
 2005: Odem (with Wolfgang Puschnig and Jatinder Thakur) (EmArcy), with Wolfgang Puschnig and Jatinder Thakur
 2006: Homescape (ACT), with Nguyên Lê Duos Paolo Fresu
 2008: Jo & Co (Universal Music Polska), with Anna Maria Jopek feat. Richard Bona and Mino Cinelu
 2008: Latitudini – Omaggio Alla World Music (Casa Del Jazz), with Paolo Fresu and Eivind Aarset
 2017: Luna (Original Motion Picture Soundtrack) with Iain Ballamy And Dave McKean Featuring Dhafer Youssef, Emilia Mårtensson With Stian Carstensen, Stuart Hall, Matthew Sharp (Feral Records)

References

External links 
 
 
 Dhafer Youssef – 39th Gülay (To Istanbul) on YouTube
 BBC – Awards for World Music 2006 – Dhafer Youssef
 An All About Jazz article mentioning him
 

1967 births
Living people
Jazzland Recordings (1997) artists
Tunisian jazz composers
Enja Records artists
EmArcy Records artists
Justin Time Records artists
Okeh Records artists
ACT Music artists
Tunisian oud players
Modal jazz oud players